Umedalen skulpturpark is an art exhibition and a sculpture garden in Umeå in Sweden.

History
An art exhibition was arranged in Umedalen for the first time in 1994 and it is now a permanent exhibition in a sculpture garden at the previous Umedalen hospital precinct.

The property company Balticgruppen (The Baltic Group), together with Art Gallery Galleri Sandström Andersson, in 1987 bought the uncommissioned psychiatric hospital Umedalen, around 20 stone houses in a park, by the Västerbotten County Council. Sweden's largest art gallery has been built around the historic buildings that were previously used as the hospital. Balticgruppen has purchased 44 sculptures, which now form the permanent exhibition in the sculpture park.

Permanently exhibited sculptures
Untitled, granite, 2001, by Bård Breivik
Black, Grey, Broken Sky and Palest Blue, 2010, ceramic tiles and steel, by Astrid Sylwan
Forest Hill, 1997, plastic pipes, concrete, by Buky Schwartz
The most lonesome story ever told, 1998, by Jonas Kjellgren
Heart of trees, 2007, bronze and trees, by Jaume Plensa
Nosotros, 2008, painted steel by Jaume Plensa
Emergency station (Räddningsplats), 2008, textile, grass, sun flower seeds, by Gunilla Samberg
Untitled, 1998, painted bronze, by Roland Persson
Hardback, 2000, concrete, by Nina Saunders
Mor och Barn (Mother and child), 1958, bronze, by David Wretling
Still Running 1990-93, cast iron, by Antony Gormley
Another Time VIII, 2007, cast iron, by Antony Gormley
Pillar of light, 1991, sandstone, by Anish Kapoor
55 meter long double-line of double-boulders, 1997, boulders, by Richard Nonas
Vegetation Room VII, 2000, resin and bronze powder panels, by Cristina Iglesias
Untitled, 1994, galvanized bathtubs, by Carina Gunnars
Arch, 1995, granite, by Claes Hake
Eye Benches II, 1996–97, black granite from Zimbabwe, by Louise Bourgeois
Social Meeting, 1997, wooden skis, by Raffael Reinsberg
Untitled (1998), painted bronze, by Roland Persson
She leaves the lights on and forgets the room 1998, steel and sanitary porcelain, by Meta Isaeus-Berlin
Stevensson (Early Forms), bronze, 1999, by Tony Cragg
Alliansring (Wedding ring), 2000, bronze, by Anna Renström
Skogsdunge (Forest grove), 2002, flag poles, by Kari Cavén
Untitled, 2002, stainless steel, by Anne-Karin Furunes
Homestead, 2004, wood, concrete, by Clay Ketter
Dysfunctional Outdoor Gym, 2004, wood, metal and ropes, by Torgny Nilsson
Den sjuka flickan (The sick girl), 2004, steel, by Jacob Dahlgren
Flip, 2006, painted steel, by Mats Bergquist
Tillåtet (Allowed), 1990-2006, vinyl and aluminium, by Mikael Richter
 Concrete and leaves, 1996, concrete, by Miroslaw Balka
Koma-Amok, 1997, steel, by Bigert & Bergström
Umea Prototype, 1999-2000, corten steel with silver birch trees, by Serge Spitzer
Trajan's Shadow, 2001, bronze, oil paint, steel, by Sean Henry
Beam Walk, 1996, steel, by Cristos Gianakos
Out, 2004, bronze, by Charlotte Gyllenhammar
Kastenhaus 1166, 2000, metal, wood, PVC, by Winter & Hörbelt

Gallery

References
 Sculptures, at Umedalen Skulptur website May, 2014
 Skulpturguide Umeå, published by Västerbottens konstförening, Umeå 2006,

Notes

External links
 Website of Umedalen Skulptur

Sculptures in Sweden
Sculpture gardens, trails and parks in Sweden
Public art in Umeå
Parks in Umeå